Ann Merchant Boesgaard is an astronomer and professor who received the American Astronomical Society's highest award, the Henry Norris Russell Lectureship in 2019. The minor planet 7804 Boesgaard is named after her, the name having been proposed by Dutch astronomers C.J. van Houten and Ingrid van Houten-Groeneveld.

Boesgaard received her bachelor's degree magna cum laude  in 1961 from Mount Holyoke College, and a Ph.D. from the University of California, Berkeley in 1966. She subsequently became a professor at the University of Hawaii. 

She was elected a Legacy Fellow of the American Astronomical Society in 2020

References

Further reading 
 Boesgaard, Ann M. One woman's journey. Mercury, v. 21, Jan./Feb. 1992: 19–22, 37. illus., ports. QB1.M43, v. 21
 Boesgaard, Ann M. In Who's who in technology. 7th ed. Kimberly A. McGrath, editor. New York, Gale Research [1995] p. 109. T39.W5 1995
 Morrison, Nancy D., and Andrew Fraknoi. The 1990 A.S.P. awards. The Muhlmann Prize to Ann Boesgaard. Mercury, v. 19, Nov./Dec. 1990: 182–185. illus., port.QB1.M43, v. 19
 Parker, Barry. Ann Boesgaard. In his Stairway to the stars; the story of the world's largest observatory. Drawings by Lori Scoffield. New York, Plenum Press [1994] p. 278–282. port. QB82.U62M387 1994.

External links 

 Faculty profile at the University of Hawaii

Year of birth missing (living people)
Living people
University of Hawaiʻi faculty
American women astronomers
Mount Holyoke College alumni
University of California, Berkeley alumni
Fellows of the American Astronomical Society